A bogie is part of a railway car.

Bogie may also refer to:

Places

Australia 
 Bogie, Queensland, a locality in the Whitsunday Region
 Bogie, a river in Queensland, Australia—see Bogie River Hills

United Kingdom 
 River Bogie, Scotland

United States 
Boca Ciega High School, a senior high school in Gulfport, Florida, colloquially called Bogie

People 
Nickname
 Humphrey Bogart (1899–1957), American actor
 Xander Bogaerts (born 1992), Aruban professional baseball player
 W. A. "Bogie" Roberts, a footballer in the late 1890s
 Moshe "Bogie" Ya'alon, Israeli politician
Surname
 Bogie (surname)

Other uses 
 Bogie, an attendant of Jack in the Green, a character in traditional English May Day parades and other May celebrations
 Bogies, a recurring feature in the Dick & Dom in da Bungalow British television show for children
 The Bogies, a comic strip in The Dandy
 15495 Bogie, an asteroid
 A type of flatbed trolley for moving bulk loads

See also 
 Bogey (disambiguation)
 Bogy (disambiguation)
 Boogie (disambiguation)
 Bougie (disambiguation)
 Buggie (disambiguation)